Muriel Noah Ahanda (born 25 May 1982) is a Cameroonian sprinter. She competed in the women's 4 × 400 metres relay at the 2004 Summer Olympics.

References

External links

1982 births
Living people
Athletes (track and field) at the 2004 Summer Olympics
Cameroonian female sprinters
Olympic athletes of Cameroon
Place of birth missing (living people)
African Games medalists in athletics (track and field)
African Games silver medalists for Cameroon
Athletes (track and field) at the 2003 All-Africa Games
Olympic female sprinters